Lineke Majolee (born 30 September 1938) is a Dutch gymnast. She competed in six events at the 1960 Summer Olympics.

References

External links
 

1938 births
Living people
Dutch female artistic gymnasts
Olympic gymnasts of the Netherlands
Gymnasts at the 1960 Summer Olympics
People from Heiloo
Sportspeople from North Holland